Gârbova may refer to the following places in Romania:

 Gârbova, a commune in southern Alba County
 Gârbova de Jos, a village in the municipality Aiud, northern Alba County
 Gârbova de Sus, a village in the municipality Aiud, northern Alba County
 Gârbova (Mureș), a river in northern Alba County
 Gârbova (Secaș), a river in Sibiu and Alba Counties